Muhammad Fareez bin Mohd Farhan (born 29 July 1994) is a Singaporean professional footballer who plays as a forward for Malaysia Super League club Kelantan and the Singapore national team.

Club career

Gombak United
Fareez began his footballing career with Gombak United in 2011. The teenage forward became the youngest player since Hariss Harun to make his debut in the S.League against Albirex Niigata (S) on 11 April 2011, coming on for South Korean striker Chang Jo-Yoon in the 88th minute. He was then the second youngest player to play in the S.League at 16 years 7 months and 13 days. He scored his first league goal in the 2-1 defeat against Singapore Armed Forces on 25 June 2011.

In February 2011, Fareez's father contacted Serbian coach Luka Lalic who arranged a six-week-long trial for the player at Croatian giants Dinamo Zagreb. Dinamo Zagreb wanted to keep Fareez, but were unable to sign him under new FIFA regulations in the wake of Chelsea's alleged tapping-up of French youngster Gael Kakuta in 2009.

Young Lions
Following Gombak United's decision to sit out the 2013 S.League, Fareez signed for Courts Young Lions. As he was in the  Singapore Police Force for compulsory national services in Singapore, he only appeared four times and failed to score for the club.

Hougang United
Fareez Farhan signed for Hougang United in December 2014. He scored 2 goals in 12 appearances for the club.

Young Lions
Fareez resigned for the Young Lions for the 2016 S.League season and made a fine start to the season, scoring 3 goals in 6 appearances. Fareez scored his fourth goal in his seventh appearance, becoming the top scoring local-born footballer.

Return to Hougang
Fareez signed again for Hougang United in December 2017, after his release from Young Lions.

Geylang International
For the 2019 AIA Singapore Premier League season, Geylang announced that Fareez had signed for Geylang International. He made his debut in a 1-0 win over Albirex Niigata Singapore. On the 5th of April he scored his first goal in a 5-2 victory over Warriors FC. In total, he scored nine goals from 23 appearances to help the Eagles finish fifth in the 2019 Singapore Premier League.

International career
Singapore national football team's Coach Tatsuma Yoshida called up Fareez Farhan to replace Khairul Amri for the 2022 World Cup qualifiers against Yemen and Palestine in their first two Group D matches. Fareez made his debut against Palestine on 10 September 2019. He won his second cap and his first start in a friendly against Jordan.

Career statistics

Club
Statistics accurate as of 19 Mar 2022

International statistics

International caps

References

External links 
 

Living people
1994 births
Singaporean footballers
Gombak United FC players
Young Lions FC players
Singapore Premier League players
Association football midfielders
Association football forwards
Singapore youth international footballers